The gloomy tube-nosed bat (Murina tenebrosa) is a species of vesper bat in the family Vespertilionidae. It is only known by the holotype, an old female, collected on Tsushima Island in 1962. It might be possibly extinct as Tsushima is badly deforested and surveys to rediscover this species failed. Due to its imperiled status, it is identified by the Alliance for Zero Extinction as a species in danger of imminent extinction.

References

Murininae
Taxonomy articles created by Polbot
Mammals described in 1970
Bats of Asia